Sir Hugh de Cressingham (died 11 September 1297) was the treasurer of the English administration in Scotland from 1296 to 1297. He was an adviser to John de Warenne, 6th Earl of Surrey at the Battle of Stirling Bridge. He suggested a full-scale attack across the bridge, which cost the English the battle and led to his death.

Life
Cressingham was a son of William de Cressingham. Hugh was a clerk and one of the officers of the English exchequer, was employed in a matter arising from some wrongs done to the abbot of Ramsey in 1282; he was attached to the household of Eleanor of Castile, queen of Edward I, was her steward, and one of her bailiffs for the barony of Haverford. In 1292 the king employed him to audit the debts due to his late father, Henry III, and in that and during the next three years he was the head of the justices itinerant for the northern counties. He was presented to the parsonage of Chalk, Kent, by the prior and convent of Norwich, and held the rectory of Doddington in the same county (Hasted); he was also rector of ‘Ruddeby’ (Rudby in Cleveland), and held prebends in several churches (Hemingburgh).

In 1296 Edward appointed Cressingham treasurer of the kingdom, charging him to spare no expense necessary for the complete reduction of Scotland.

Cressingham was killed during the Battle of Stirling Bridge on 11 September 1297. According to legend, his body was flayed by the Scots as he had flayed Scottish war prisoners, and William Wallace made a sword belt out of his skin. The Lanercost Chronicle states the Scots dried and cured his hide and 

The Scalacronica merely states that

Walter of Hemingburgh recorded,

Family and issue
He is known to have left a daughter Alice, who married Robert de Aspale and had issue.

In popular culture
In the 1995 film Braveheart Cressingham is portrayed by the actor Gerard McSorley, and dies by being beheaded by the Scottish rebel leader William Wallace.  Unlike real history, his name in the film was 'Lord Cheltham' and he was ordered to lead a battalion of English infantry by a superior, who is presumably the film's equivalent of John de Warenne, 6th Earl of Surrey.

Citations

References

1297 - William Wallace & Andrew Moray defeat English from National Library of Scotland

English politicians
1297 deaths
English people of the Wars of Scottish Independence
13th-century English people
Treasurers of Scotland
Year of birth unknown